Adams Farm may refer to:
 Adams Farm (Princess Anne, Maryland)
 Adams Farm (Harrisville, New Hampshire)

See also
Adams-Fairview Bonanza Farm, Wahepton, North Dakota
Adams House (disambiguation)
 John A. Adams Farmstead Historic District, Warrensburg, Missouri